Zhongshan Park Station, is a station of Line 2 of Wuhan Metro. It entered revenue service on December 28, 2012. It is located in Jianghan District.

Station layout

Gallery

Entrance

Transfers
Bus transfers to Route 1, 42, 64, 548, 549, 571, 592, 705, 712, 721, 726, 802, 808 and T3 are available at Zhongshan Park Station.

Around the station
 Wuhan Union Hospital

References

Wuhan Metro stations
Line 2, Wuhan Metro
Railway stations in China opened in 2012